Alberto Mestre may refer to:
 Alberto Mestre (swimmer, born 1964)
 Alberto Mestre (swimmer, born 1999)